Dobrosławice may refer to the following places in Poland:
Dobrosławice, Lower Silesian Voivodeship (south-west Poland)
Dobrosławice, Opole Voivodeship (south-west Poland)